Hinduism is practised by 0.3% of the people in Italy. It is practised by 0.1% of the Italian citizens and 2.9% of the immigrant population. In 2012, there were about 90,000 Hindus in Italy. In 2015, the population increased to 120,000. As of 2022, the population is around 200,000 - the second largest Hindu community in Europe after the United Kingdom, and the largest Hindu community in the European Union.

Demographics

Official recognition as a religion
Hindus are pressing for official recognition in Italy. Unione Induista Italia has signed in 2007 an Intente with the Italian government. The document was then waiting for approval by the Italian Parliament. Hinduism was granted official recognition by the Italian Parliament in 2012 alongside Buddhism.
On 11 December 2012, the Italian Parliament ratified an official agreement (Intesa) with the Italian Hindu Union (L.31/12/2012 n. 246). As declared in Article 24 of the Law of agreement, Dipavali or Diwali, the Festival of Lights, is recognized in Italy as the official Hindu religious festival of the Hindu organization.

Matha Gitananda Ashram
It is one of the three Hindu monasteries in Europe. The Hindu monastery Matha Gitananda Ashrama is located in Località Pellegrino in the Municipality of Altare. It stands on a hill 520m high, in the inland of Savona.

See also
 Hinduism by country

References

External links

 Centro Studi Bhaktivedanta- Center in Italy for study of Vaishnava history and philosophy
 Italy's Hindu Controversy

 
Hinduism by country